John Andrew Claughton (born 28 October 1978) is an English former first-class cricketer.

The nephew of the cricketer John Claughton senior, he was born at Southampton in October 1978. He was educated at King Edward's School, Southampton before going up to Keble College, Oxford. While studying at Oxford, he played first-class cricket for Oxford University, making his debut against Worcestershire at Oxford in 1998. He played twelve further first-class matches for Oxford to 2000, scoring 477 runs at an average of 29.81, with a high score of 85. He also made two first-class appearances for an Oxford Universities side in 2000, a forerunner of Oxford UCCE which was formed in 2001. His cousin, Tom, also played first-class cricket.

References

External links

1978 births
Living people
Cricketers from Southampton
People educated at King Edward's School, Birmingham
Alumni of Keble College, Oxford
English cricketers
Oxford University cricketers
Oxford Universities cricketers